Meinhard V, Count of Gorizia (b. after 1297 - d. after 1318) was a member of the Albertine line of the House of Gorizia. He was a son of Count Henry III and his first wife Beatrix dei Camerino.

Little is known about his life. He was probably co-ruler with his father. Around 1314, his father negotiated Meinhard's marriage with a daughter of king James II of Aragon.

References 

Year of birth unknown
14th-century deaths
Year of death unknown
Counts of Gorizia
14th-century people of the Holy Roman Empire